The 1990 SCCA Escort World Challenge season was the inaugural season of the Sports Car Club of America's World Challenge series under the sprint race format, after changing its name from the Escort Endurance Championship while keeping the corporate sponsor of Escort radar detectors. The series would also have to share attention with the SCCA's main series, Trans Am. This would be the only season to feature only two classes until 1997, between which the series would use three to five classes per season. Peter Cunningham got his first win, finishing first at Laguna Seca Raceway in a Honda CRX. This would begin a longtime relationship between Cunningham and Honda, as well as his longtime career in the series, in which he is now the best-performing driver by number of wins.

Results

References

GT World Challenge America